Little Friend is a 1934 British drama film directed by Berthold Viertel and starring Matheson Lang, Nova Pilbeam and Lydia Sherwood.  The film was based on a novel by Ernst Lothar and adapted for the screen by Margaret Kennedy and Christopher Isherwood. The score is by the Austrian composer then in exile Ernst Toch.

Plot summary
A young girl (Pilbeam) slowly becomes aware that her parents' marriage is disintegrating.

Cast
 Matheson Lang ...  John Hughes
 Lydia Sherwood ...  Helen Hughes
 Nova Pilbeam ...  Felicity Hughes
 Arthur Margetson ...  Hilliard
 Jean Cadell ...  Miss Drew
 Jimmy Hanley ...  Leonard Parry
 Gibb McLaughlin ...  Thompson
 Diana Cotton ...  Maud
 Cecil Parker ...  Mason
 Clare Greet ...  Mrs. Parry
 Jack Raine ...  Jeffries
 Finlay Currie ...  Grove
 Robert Nainby ...  Uncle Ned
 Atholl Fleming ...  Shepherd
 Basil Goth ...  Doctor
 Charles Childerstone ...  Solicitor
 Gerald Kent ...  Butler
 Allan Aynesworth ...  Col. Amberley
 Lewis Casson ...  Judge
 Fritz Kortner ...  Giant
 Hughie Green ... Boy

Prater Violet
Christopher Isherwood based his novel Prater Violet (1945) on his experience of working with Viertel and others on the production of Little Friend.

References

Bibliography
 Jonathan Fryer, Isherwood: A Biography (Garden City, NY, Doubleday, 1977)

External links

1934 films
1934 drama films
British drama films
Films directed by Berthold Viertel
Films scored by Ernst Toch
Films about divorce
British black-and-white films
Films with screenplays by Berthold Viertel
1930s English-language films
1930s British films
English-language drama films